Johann Peter Migendt, also Migend, (1703 – 19 September 1767) was a German organ builder in Berlin and successor to Joachim Wagner.

Life 
Migend was born in Birthälm, Principality of Transylvania (now Biertan, Sibiu County, Romania). From 1731/32 he worked for Joachim Wagner in Berlin, and from 1741 he was his master craftsman after the death of Kallensee. A joint contract with Wagner for a new organ is known from 1747, and in 1749 he took over Wagner's workshop. In 1755 Peter Migendt built a house at what later became Münzstraße 9 in the Spandauer Vorstadt, In 1756 he received the Berlin citizenship.

Among others, his employees were Georg Friedrich Grüneberg (until about 1756) and Ernst Julius Marx, who probably took over the workshop after 1667. He died in 1767 in Berlin.

List of works (selection) 
New organs, rebuildings, two relocations, repairs, offers for new organs and expertises are known from Johann Peter Migendt. The organs in Ueckermünde (previously Berlin, Neue Kirche), the Amalien organ in Berlin-Karlshorst (previously in the castle) and the organ in Ringenwalde have survived.

New organ buildings

Other works

References

Further reading 
 Christhard Kirchner: Der Berliner Orgelbauer Peter Migendt (1703–1767). In Mitteilungen des Vereins für die Geschichte Berlins 86, 1990, .
 Christhard Kirchner: Johann Peter Migendt. In Uwe Pape, Wolfram Hackel, Christhard Kirchner (Hrsg.): Lexikon norddeutscher Orgelbauer. Volume 4. Berlin, Brandenburg und Umgebung. Pape Verlag, Berlin 2017. pp. 373f.

1703 births
1767 deaths
People from Sibiu County
German pipe organ  builders
Transylvanian Saxon people